The Penrhyn language is a Cook Islands Maori dialectal variant belonging to the Polynesian language family spoken by about 200 people on Penrhyn Island and other islands in the Northern Cook Islands.  It is considered to be an endangered language as many of its users are shifting to Cook Islands Māori and English.

Phonology

Alphabet
A, E, H, I, K, M, N, Ng, O, P, R, T, U, V

Long vowels are written with a macron.

Consonants

Tongareva is one of the few Cook Islands languages without a glottal stop . There is allophonic voicing of stops present.  is present in loanwords from languages like Rakahanga-Manihiki language.

Grammar

References

Tahitic languages
Languages of New Zealand
Endangered Austronesian languages